C. orientalis may refer to:
 Caecilia orientalis, an amphibian species found in Colombia and Ecuador
 Carcharodus orientalis, the Oriental skipper, a butterfly species found in eastern Europe to Asia Minor
 Carpinus orientalis, the Oriental hornbeam, a tree species native from southeastern Europe to northern Iran
 Canna orientalis, a garden plant
 Channa orientalis, the ceylon snakehead, a freshwater fish species found in Sri Lanka
 Chromodoris orientalis, a colorful sea slug species
 Cladogynos orientalis, a plant species found in Southeast Asia and Malesia
 Coccothrinax orientalis, a palm species endemic to eastern Cuba
 Collocalia orientalis, the Mayr's swiftlet, a swift species found in Papua New Guinea and Solomon Islands
 Colutea orientalis, a leguminous shrub species native to Europe and Asia
 Conringia orientalis, the hare's ear mustard, a flowering plant species native to Eurasia
 Crataegus orientalis, a hawthorn species native to the Mediterranean region, Turkey, Caucasia, Crimea and western Iran
 Crocidura orientalis, the Oriental shrew, a mammal species endemic to Indonesia
 Crossobamon orientalis, the Sind gecko, a lizard species found in Pakistan and India
 Cynops orientalis, the Chinese fire belly newt, a small newt species

Synonyms
 Cissus orientalis, a synonym for Ampelopsis arborea, an ornamental plant species native to the United States
 Caudisona orientalis or Crotalus orientalis, synonyms for Crotalus durissus, a snake species found in South America

See also
 Orientalis (disambiguation)